McBusted is the self-titled debut and only studio album by the English pop punk supergroup McBusted. It was released through Island Records on 1 December 2014. The album was preceded by the release of lead single "Air Guitar", which peaked at number 12 in the United Kingdom.

The album received positive reviews from music critics. It debuted at number nine on the UK Albums Chart, whilst also making 31 in the Republic of Ireland.

Background and development
In November 2013, it was announced that Busted's James Bourne and Matt Willis would come together with McFly and tour together as the supergroup "McBusted". Between April and June 2014, they performed 42 sold-out shows across the UK and Ireland, playing Busted and McFly's greatest hits. They also headlined British Summer Time in Hyde Park on 6 July. Due to the enormous success of the tour, it was reported that they could release new material together. During an interview on The Jonathan Ross Show in February 2014, Willis said: "We always said that we weren't going to say we were going to bring out music, because we didn't want to say that we were going to make music and it be terrible. But we went away, we did some writing and it wasn't terrible." In April, Judd revealed that they would be releasing an album. He told Capital FM, "We were thinking of going in the studio and properly laying something down before the tour started. We've had no time because of Tom [Fletcher] having his baby, the tour rehearsals and Matt's filming bits on EastEnders. Everyone has been so busy. It will happen after the tour. We'll be writing on the road and hopefully soon after the tour we'll get in the studio."

On 7 October 2014, Fletcher revealed that McBusted would be releasing their debut single "Air Guitar" on 23 November. Additionally, it was announced that they had been signed to Island Records, after a bidding war with Sony Music. Fletcher also posted a sneak preview of the song on his Instagram page. On 23 October, the band announced via Twitter that their debut album McBusted would be available to pre-order the following day, before its official release on 1 December. The album includes the songs "What Happened to Your Band", which Bourne wrote after the break-up of Busted, and "Hate Your Guts", which features Blink-182 bassist and vocalist, Mark Hoppus (who also wrote the track "Sensitive Guy"). The album also features appearances by All Time Low lead singer Alex Gaskarth and Weezer frontman Rivers Cuomo. Regarding Hoppus, Fletcher said, "He'd been such a huge influence on our songwriting that to finally get in a room with him was so fun, if slightly surreal." "What Happened to Your Band" was released on 11 November 2014, with "Hate Your Guts" following one week later on 18 November 2014, both as promotional songs available to fans who had pre-ordered the album via iTunes.

The track 'What Happened to Your Band' had been written by Bourne years before the band or the album had been planned. The track was written about Busted's split, and was initially performed by Son of Dork on their Sic Tour (2007). It was planned for release of the deluxe edition of Welcome to Loserville, however said version of the album never amounted and the song was never recorded, and the edition on McBusted was the first released. The song has since been re-worked by Willis, Bourne and Charlie Simpson as Busted and was featured on their 2019 release Half Way There.

Singles
On 7 October 2014, it was announced that McBusted's debut single would be called "Air Guitar" and would be released on 23 November. The song debuted at number 12 on the UK Singles Chart.

The second single to be taken from the album was the song "Get Over It". The single was released on 12 January 2015, reaching number 82 on the UK Singles Chart, failing to match the success of lead single "Air Guitar".

Critical reception

The album received mixed-to-positive reviews from critics. Lucy Bacon of MTV said "this talented bunch of boys have knocked their heads together and really delivered with their debut self-titled record", and called it "a perfectly blended combination of [McFly and Busted]". Jeremy Williams-Chalmers of So So Gay was more positive still, calling the album "an amazingly rounded debut", with a demonstration of an "ability to connect on more than one level that makes them such an excitingly addictive prospect".

On the other hand, Tim Jonze of The Guardian was less positive, asking if "perhaps a McBusted album that engaged seriously with the loss of mega-success would have made for a better listen", but still praised 'What Happened To Your Band' as "a harmony-drenched pop-punk number that makes post-fame despair seem oddly relatable."

Track listing

Charts and certifications

Weekly charts

Year-end charts

Certifications

Personnel
Personnel per booklet.

McBusted

McFly
 Danny Jones - vocals (all), guitar (all)
 Tom Fletcher - vocals (all), guitar (all)
 Harry Judd - drums (all), percussion (all)
 Dougie Poynter - vocals (all), bass (1-4, 9-12, 14)

Busted
 James Bourne - vocals (all), guitar (3, 8, 15)
 Matt Willis - vocals (all), bass (1, 5-8, 13, 15)

Additional musicians
 Steve Robson - keyboards (all), synth bass (5)
 Mark Hoppus - vocals (2)
 Alex Gaskarth - vocals (4)

Release history

References

2014 debut albums
Island Records albums
McBusted albums